A Megasite or Mega-Site is a land development by private developers, universities, or governments to promote business clusters.  These organizations develop the land so that it is "shovel ready" for big business, by improving the infrastructure (roads, utilities, and landscape).  Megasites can be an industrial district, business park, research park, science park, commercial district, tourist park or a combination of these.

Location
Megasites are located in suburban to rural areas, in contrast to business districts located in downtown city centers. These sites are typically created close to pre-existing transportation infrastructure (interstates, railroads, intermodal ports, airports,  and rivers) and public utilities (electricity, substations, natural gas, water, sewage,  fixed-line, and Broadband internet services from Coaxial cable to fiber-optic and Mobile broadband).  It's also located close to human capital such as large populations, universities, or tech schools. Land area for these sites can range from several hundred to several thousand acres.

Examples

Government
Memphis Regional Megasite,  Golden Triangle (Mississippi), and Research Triangle Park (North Carolina) are examples of government initiated Megasites in America.

Private
CenterPoint Properties, Eastman Business Park, and Denver Tech Center are examples of private Mega-Sites.

University
Stanford Industrial Park (now Stanford Research Park) was the first university to facilitate a private Megasite, that led to the creation of Silicon Valley.

Military bases to megasites
Decommissioned military bases have been converted in the past to economic hubs.   They repurpose the buildings and redevelop the land while working with and selling/leasing the land to private developers.  

Military bases are secessioned from the state, hence they don't have to pay sales taxes at the exchanges.  If they were to keep that land partitioned from the state, business and property would be exempt from local and state taxes, making it a boom for business clusters.

See also
Industrial district
Business park
Research park
Science park
Hsinchu Science and Industrial Park
Songdo International Business District
Stanford Research Park
Silicon Valley
Base Realignment and Closure

References

Economic geography
Strategic management
Planned industrial developments